Agnetha Fältskogs Bästa (Agnetha Fältskog's Best) is a compilation album by the Swedish pop singer and ABBA member Agnetha Fältskog. It was released in 1973 through CBS Cupol.

Album information
To fill the gap between her last album När en vacker tanke blir en sång, dating back to 1971, and the next album which would eventually be called Elva kvinnor i ett hus and released in late 1975, Agnetha Fältskogs Bästa was released at the end of 1973. Because of the unexpected success of the quartet Björn, Benny, Agnetha & Frida in 1973, and the following year's victory in the Eurovision Song Contest with "Waterloo", the release of her next Swedish-language studio album was delayed until late 1975.

The album included many of her biggest hits from all her four previously released studio albums, starting with her breakthrough single "Jag var så kär", dating back to 1967. Out of the eleven songs included, ten had reached the top 10 of the important Swedish radio chart Svensktoppen. Despite her tight schedule with the group that would eventually be named ABBA (1973 saw them promoting the Ring Ring album as well as recording the Waterloo LP), Fältskog nevertheless managed to record two new songs for Agnetha Fältskogs Bästa: "En sång om sorg och glädje" and "Vi har hunnit fram till refrängen", a cover of "Our Last Song Together" by Neil Sedaka. Both would also be released on single, with "En sång om sorg och glädje" appearing on the A-side and also topping the Svensktoppen charts in late 1973 and early 1974. The recording session of those two tracks marked the first time that Fältskog produced her own recordings, a job which she enjoyed and eventually repeated on all of her future Swedish-language recordings.

Track listing

Singles

Accompanying the release of Fältskog's first greatest hits album, two newly recorded tracks were released on single in late 1973. Besides that, the album also features two recordings from 1972 which were only released on single and cannot be found on any of Fältskogs studio albums. The first of those, "Vart ska min kärlek föra", is a Swedish version of "I Don't Know How to Love Him", originally from Andrew Lloyd Webber's hit musical Jesus Christ Superstar. Fältskog played the role of Maria Magdalena in the Swedish version of the musical, which opened in Gothenburg in February 1972. Fältskog's Swedish version, produced by Björn Ulvaeus, became her first number 1 hit on Svensktoppen.

Svensktoppen
As mentioned above, Agnetha Fältskogs Bästa includes her first ever number 1 hit on Svensktoppen, "Vart ska min kärlek föra". Besides that, also the newly recorded "En sång om sorg och glädje" managed to top this chart for a total of seven weeks in the last weeks of 1973 and in early 1974. Staying on the chart for 14 weeks, it became one of her most successful hits.

References
 booklet, Agnetha Fältskog: Agnetha Fältskog De Första Åren
 Bright Lights Dark Shadows – The Real Story Of ABBA by Carl Magnus Palm
 https://web.archive.org/web/20100210202925/http://www.agnetha.net/AGNETHA.html

1973 greatest hits albums
Agnetha Fältskog compilation albums